HTTP Switchboard is a Chromium browser extension (which also works with other Chromium-based browsers such as Opera (from version 15) and the Yandex browser) that allows filtering of Hypertext Transfer Protocol  (HTTP) requests based on the content and/or the target's domain name. It comes with an optional, pre-defined blacklist of hostnames that might be a privacy threat when sending requests to them and/or a security threat/annoyance due to the content delivered in the response. HTTP Switchboard's developer, Raymond Hill, has also developed other browser extensions, including ad filtering uBlock which he actively leads as uBlock Origin.

HTTP Switchboard is no longer being actively developed. It has instead been replaced by uBlock Origin as well as uMatrix, the latter being an as-of-now unmaintained extension aimed at more advanced users.

References

External links 
 Project Homepage

Free security software
Google Chrome extensions